That's Your Lot is the debut studio album by English rock band, Blaenavon. The album was released through Atlantic Records on 7 April 2017.

Track listing

Charts

References 

2017 debut albums
Atlantic Records albums